Ben Kane (born 6 March 1970) is a novelist, specialising in historical fiction. He is best known for The Forgotten Legion, Spartacus and Hannibal book series. Six of his eight novels have been Sunday Times bestsellers, and his books have been published in more than ten countries, including the US, Italy, Spain, Greece, Russia and the Netherlands.

In 2013, Kane and two friends walked the entire length of Hadrian's Wall for charity while wearing full Roman military kit, including hobnailed boots. They raised nearly £19,000 for Combat Stress and Medecins Sans Frontieres. In 2014, they walked again in Italy, raising over £26,500. A documentary film was made about their walk, entitled The Road to Rome. Ian McKellen provides the voiceover.

Bibliography

The Forgotten Legion Trilogy
 The Forgotten Legion (2008)
 The Silver Eagle (2009)
 The Road to Rome (2010)

The Hannibal series
 Hannibal: Enemy of Rome (2011)
 "Hannibal: The Patrol" (short story, 2013); e-book only
 Hannibal: Fields of Blood (2013)
 Hannibal: Clouds of War (2014)

The Spartacus series
 Spartacus: The Gladiator (2012)
 Spartacus: Rebellion (2012)

The Eagles of Rome series
 "The Shrine" (short story, 2015); e-book only
 Eagles at War (2015)
 "The Arena" (short story, 2016); e-book only
 Hunting the Eagles (2016)
 Eagles in the Storm (2017)

The Clash of Empires series
 Clash of Empires (2018)
 The Falling Sword (2019)

The Lionheart series
 Lionheart (2020)
 Crusader (2021)
 King (2022)

Other
 A Day of Fire: A Novel of Pompeii (2014); Kane contributed one chapter
 Sands of the Arena and Other Stories (forthcoming September 2021)

References

External links
  (Ben Kane website and blog)
 Ben Kane at Facebook
 

Living people
1970 births
Writers of historical fiction set in antiquity
Alumni of University College Dublin
Kenyan medical writers